The women's doubles tennis event at the 2019 Summer Universiade was held from 6 to 12 July at the Circolo Tennis and Lungomare in Naples, Italy.

China's Guo Hanyu and Ye Qiuyu won the gold medals, defeating Chinese Taipei's Lee Pei-chi and Lee Ya-hsuan in the final, 6–7(8–10), 6–2, [10–8].

Japan's Kanako Morisaki and Naho Sato, and Hong Kong's Eudice Chong and Maggie Ng won the bronze medals.

Seeds
The top three seeds receive a bye into the second round.

Draw

Finals

Top half

Bottom half

References
Main Draw

Women's doubles